Umrao Jaan Ada is an Urdu novel by Mirza Hadi Ruswa (1857–1931), first published in 1899. It is considered the first Urdu novel by many and tells the story of a courtesan and poet by the same name from 19th century Lucknow, as recounted by her to the author.

History and theme
According to the novel, the story of Umrao Jaan was recounted by her to the author, when he happened to meet her during a mushaira (poetry gathering) in Lucknow. On listening to her couplets, the author along with Munshi Ahmad, a novel and poetry enthusiast present at the gathering, convinces Umrao Jaan to share her life story with them. The novel is written in first person as a memoir. The book was first published by Gulab Munshi and Sons Press, Lucknow in 1899.

The novel is known for its elaborate portrayal of mid-19th century Lucknow, its decadent society, and also describes the moral hypocrisy of the era, where Umrao Jaan also becomes the symbol of a nation that had long attracted many suitors who were only looking to exploit her.

The existence of Umrao Jaan Ada is disputed among scholars as there are few mentions of her outside of Ruswa's book. She does appear in his earlier unfinished novel Afshai Raz, but is very different from the cultured character in Umrao Jaan Ada. The existence of an Uttar Pradesh dacoit named Fazal Ali is recorded, and there are British documents that mention the claims of a courtesan named Azizan Bai who stated that she was taught by Umrao Jaan.

Plot summary

Umrao Jaan is born as Amiran to a modest family in Faizabad. After the criminal Dilawar Khan is released from jail, he decides to get revenge as her father testified against him in court. Khan kidnaps Amiran and decides to sell her in Lucknow. She is imprisoned with another girl, Ram Dai, but the two are separated when Dilawar Khan takes her to Lucknow. There she is sold for 150 rupees to Khanum Jaan, the head tawaif of a kotha. She is renamed Umrao and begins to study classical music and dance. Together with the other apprentice tawaif and Gauhar Mirza, the mischievous illegitimate son of a local Nawab, she is taught to read and write in both Urdu and Persian. As Umrao grows up, she is surrounded by a culture of luxury, music and poetry. She eventually gains her first client, (earning her the suffix of jaan) but prefers the impoverished Gauhar Mirza, her friend.

Umrao Jaan attracts the handsome and wealthy Nawab Sultan. The couple fall in love, but, after an altercation with an impolite patron where the Nawab Sultan shoots and wound hims in the arm, he no longer comes to the kotha and Umrao Jaan must meet him secretly with the help of Gauhar Mirza. As Umrao Jaan continues to see Nawab Sultan and also serve other clients, she supports Gauhar Mirza with her earnings. A new client, the mysterious Faiz Ali, showers Umrao Jaan with jewels and gold, but warns her not to tell anyone about his gifts. When he invites her to travel to Farrukhabad, Khanum Jaan refuses so Umrao Jaan must run away. On the way to Farrukhabad, they are attacked by soldiers and Umrao Jaan discovers that Faiz is a dacoit and all of his gifts have been stolen goods. Faiz Ali escapes with his brother Fazl Ali and she is imprisoned, but luckily one of the tawaif from Khanum Jaan's kotha is in the service of the Raja whose soldiers arrested her so Umrao Jaan is freed. As soon as she leaves the Raja's court, Faiz Ali finds her and gets her to come with him. He is soon captured and Umrao Jaan, reluctant to return to Khanum Jaan, sets up as a tawaif in Kanpur. While she is performing in the house of a kindly Begum, armed bandits led by Fazl Ali try to rob the house, but leave when they see that Umrao Jaan is there. Then Gauhar Mirza comes to Kanpur and she decides to return to the kotha.

Umrao Jaan performs at the court of Wajid Ali Shah until the Siege of Lucknow forces her to flee the city for Faizabad. There she finds her mother, but is threatened by her brother who considers her a disgrace and believes she would be better off dead. Devastated, Umrao Jaan returns to Lucknow now that the mutiny is over. She meets the Begum from Kanpur again in Lucknow and discovers that she is actually Ram Dai. By a strange twist of fate Ram Dai was sold to the mother of Nawab Sultan and the two are now married. Another ghost of Umrao Jaan's past is put to rest when Dilawar Khan is arrested and hanged for robbery. With her earnings and the gold that Faiz Ali gave her, she is able to live comfortably and eventually retires from her life as a tawaif.

Adaptations
Over the years the novel has inspired many films both in India and Pakistan. It was made into a Pakistani film in 1972, Umrao Jaan Ada, directed by Hassan Tariq, and the Indian films: Mehndi (1958) by SM Yusuf, Zindagi Ya Toofan (1958) by Nakhshab Jarchavi, Umrao Jaan (1981) by Muzaffar Ali and Umrao Jaan (2006) by JP Dutta.

The novel was also the theme of a Pakistani television serial, Umrao Jaan Ada, aired in 2003 on Geo TV. It was directed by Raana Sheikh and the screenplay was written by poet Zehra Nigah. Umrao Jaan Ada, an Indian television series adaptation of the novel aired on Doordarshan's DD Urdu channel in 2014. It ran for 13 episodes and was directed by Javed Sayyed with music from Sappan Jagmohan.

Salim–Sulaiman remade the 1981 Indian film into a musical play, Umrao Jaan Ada - The Musical, in 2019, the theatrical adaptation was directed by Rajeev Goswami with Pratibha Baghel in the titular role of the courtesan.

Further reading
 The Courtesan of Lucknow (Umrao Jan Ada), (UNESCO Collection of Representative Works). Hind Pocket Books, 1970.
 The Nautch Girl: A Novel, Hasan Shah. Translated by Qurratulain Hyder. New Delhi: Sterling Publishers, 1992.
 Umrao Jaan Ada, Mirza Hadi Ruswa, 2003, Publisher: Sang-e-Meel. .(Urdu text)
 Umrao Jan Ada. Translated by David Matthews. New Delhi, Rupa and Co., 2006. .
 Umrad Jan Ada, Translated K. Singh (English). Orient Paperbacks, 2005. . 
 Umrao Jan Ada, Translated Khushwant Singh (English). 2006. Disha Books. . 
 Umrao Dźan Ada. Pamiętnik kurtyzany, Translated and Edited by Agnieszka Kuczkiewicz-Fraś (Polish). 2011. Kraków: Księgarnia Akademicka. .
 Umrao Jan Ada. Translated in Sanskrit by Shwetaketu. .

References

External links
Complete Urdu Text of Mirza Hadi Ruswa's Umrao Jaan Ada
 Site dedicated to the work of Mirza Hadi Ruswa

1899 novels
Urdu-language novels
Indian novels adapted into films
Indian courtesans
Novels set in Lucknow
Novels about Indian prostitution
Indian novels adapted into television shows
Indian novels adapted into plays